Care for Me (stylized as CARE FOR ME) is the second studio album by American rapper Saba. It was released on April 5, 2018, by Saba Pivot, LLC., and received critical acclaim from music critics and audiences alike. The album was produced entirely by daedaePIVOT, Daoud and Saba. The album also includes guest appearances from Chance the Rapper, Kaina and theMIND.

Background
In February 2017, Saba's cousin and fellow Pivot Gang member, Walter E. "John Walt" Long was stabbed to death in Chicago. In an interview, Saba spoke about the mental process and how writing the songs on the album were therapeutic saying:

Music and lyrics
Care for Me is a concept album dedicated to the memory of his late-cousin, which Saba started working on in December 2017. The penultimate track "Prom / King" recounts a story of being set up a blind prom date by Walt, who saves him from the potential embarrassment of public loneliness. The blind date is a success and the pair head to an afterparty. The festive mood suddenly turns dangerous when the date's brother arrives and threatens to stab him. The track was initially planned to be the outro of the album however Saba felt the song was too depressing and didn't want to leave listeners with that feeling. Towards near completion of the album, Saba recalled a moment to review his progress saying: "I was listening with one of the producers and he actually pointed it out: 'Damn dude, all of these songs are about Walt,' I didn't even realize."

Critical reception 

Care for Me was met with widespread critical acclaim from music critics. At Metacritic, which assigns a normalized rating out of 100 to reviews from mainstream publications, the album received an average score of 93, based on 5 reviews. In his review for AllMusic, Fred Thomas described the album as a "masterful artistic statement" with "Beautifully minimal production [that] supports the feeling of emptiness" Writing for HipHopDX, Justin Ivey stated "With Care for Me, Saba accomplished his objective by making an album that can endure for years to come. His higher aspirations won't afford him the visibility of the rappers acting out for attention, but projects like Care for Me should put him into the discussions of his generation's best hip hop artists." Sheldon Pearce of Pitchfork gave the album a rave review, awarding it Best New Music, saying "The grief-stricken Chicago rapper’s latest is a marvel of craft, musicality, and emotion. Through Saba's inner turmoil, he finds his most powerful and diaristic storytelling." Wren Graves of Consequence of Sound wrote "At 10 breezy tracks, Care for Me isn't just a collection of songs; it’s an honest-to-god album that develops ideas at its own pace."

Accolades

Track listing

Notes
 All track titles are stylized in upper case letters, e.g. "BUSY / SIRENS".
 "Prom / King" features uncredited vocals by John Walt

Personnel
Credits are adapted from the rapper's official SoundCloud and Genius pages.

Vocalists
 Tahj Malik Chandler – vocals
 theMIND – vocals 
 Kaina – vocals 
 Chance the Rapper – vocals 

Musicians
 Saba – additional drums 
 daedaePIVOT – additional drums 
 Daoud – keyboards 
 Satya Jimenez – violin 
 Herbie One – trumpet 
 Nick Phelps – additional drums 
 Brandon Farmer – additional drums 
 Andre Mateo – guitar 
 Cheflee – bass 
 SeanZy – additional vocals 
 Emanuel Townsend – acoustic guitar 
 Huntly Morrison – guitar 

Technical
 Saba – production , executive producer
 Daoud – production , executive producer
 daedaePIVOT – production , executive producer
 Matt Wheeler – mixing 
 Alex "Papi Beatz" Baez – mixing

References

External links

2018 albums
Saba (rapper) albums
Midwest hip hop albums
Hip hop albums by American artists
Albums free for download by copyright owner
Neo soul albums
Jazz rap albums